is a Japanese manga series written and illustrated by Jun Mayuzuki. It was serialized in Shogakukan's Monthly Big Comic Spirits magazine from June 2014 to November 2015, and later in Weekly Big Comic Spirits from January 2016 to March 2018. Its chapters were compiled into ten tankōbon volumes.

A 12-episode anime television series adaptation by Wit Studio aired from January to March 2018 on Fuji TV's Noitamina programming block. A live-action film adaptation was released in May 2018.

In North America, Vertical licensed the manga and published it into five omnibus volumes from September 2018 to September 2019. The anime series has been licensed by Sentai Filmworks for home video and digital release.

In 2018, After the Rain won the 63rd Shogakukan Manga Award in the General category. As of April 2018, the manga had over 2 million copies in circulation.

Plot
After the Rain tells the story of Akira Tachibana, a high school student working part-time at a family restaurant, who starts falling in love with the manager, a forty-five-year-old divorcé with a young son. Akira struggles to determine why she is falling for Masami, and whether or not to reveal her feelings to him.

Characters
 
  (Japanese); Luci Christian (English)
 Played by: Nana Komatsu
 A high school student with a piercing expression that makes many people slightly wary of her. She used to be part of the track team, before a leg injury forced her to give up running. Having fallen into a depression, she met Masami who acted in a kind and friendly manner, offering her a free coffee when she took shelter at the restaurant in the rain. This act of kindness, began her infatuation with him. Despite her cold and inapproachable demeanor, she is actually rather timid and shy, especially when it comes to Masami.
 
  (Japanese); Jason Douglas (English)
 Played by: Yo Oizumi
 A 45-year-old manager of a family restaurant. A kind, timid man, he is often criticized by his employees for being too weak. He is divorced and has a young son named Yuto. He is initially rather intimidated by Akira, whom he assumes actually hates him, while she, in fact, is merely staring at him in love. He is a fan of "Pure Literature" and loves reading books. Prior to becoming a restaurant manager, he wrote novels alongside his former college buddy and now-renowned writer Chihiro Kujo.
 
  (Japanese); Elizabeth Maxwell (English)
 Played by: Nana Seino
 Akira's buddy on the track team, who remains steadfast in maintaining their friendship after Akira's injury.
 
  (Japanese); Maggie Flecknoe (English)
 Played by: Honoka Matsumoto
 Akira's coworker at the restaurant who has blonde hair and a cheerful personality. She has a crush on Takashi.
 
  (Japanese); Jason Liebrecht (English)
 Played by: Hayato Isomura
 A chef at the restaurant who had a sexual interest in Akira. When he learns about Akira's infatuation with Masami, he blackmails her by forcing her to date him in order to keep her secret intact.
 
  (Japanese); Gareth West (English)
 Played by: Shono Hayama
 Akira's classmate who had a crush on her. He also works at the restaurant with Akira as kitchen staff.
 
  (Japanese); Patricia Duran (English)
 Played by: Mari Hamada
 
  (Japanese); Kira Vincent-Davis (English)
 Masami's young son who attends elementary school.
 
 
 Played by: Shigeyuki Totsugi
 Masami's friend from college who is a renowned writer.

Media

Manga
After the Rain is written and illustrated by Jun Mayuzuki. The series was first serialized in Shogakukan's Monthly Big Comic Spirits from June 27, 2014, to November 27, 2015. It was then transferred to Weekly Big Comic Spirits, where it ran from January 18, 2016, to March 19, 2018. Shogakukan collected its chapters in ten tankōbon volumes, published from January 9, 2015, to April 27, 2018.

In March 2018, it was announced that Vertical licensed the manga for an English language release in North America. The manga was released into five omnibus edition volumes from September 25, 2018, to September 17, 2019.

Volume list

Anime
An anime television series adaptation was announced in March 2017. Produced by Fuji Television, Aniplex, DMM pictures, Dentsu and Wit Studio, the series is directed by Ayumu Watanabe, with Deko Akao handling series composition, Yuka Shibata designing the characters and Ryō Yoshimata composing the music. The opening theme song is "Nostalgic Rainfall" by CHiCO with HoneyWorks, while the ending theme song is "Ref:rain" by Aimer. It ran for 12 episodes from January 12 to March 30, 2018 on Fuji TV's Noitamina programming block.

Amazon streamed the series worldwide on their Amazon Video service. In March 2020, Sentai Filmworks announced the acquisition of the series for home video and digital release in North America. In the United Kingdom, the series is licensed by MVM Films and it was released on Blu-ray on October 26, 2020.

Episode list

Live-action film
A live-action film adaptation of the manga was announced in November 2017. It stars Nana Komatsu as Akira Tachibana and Yo Oizumi as the manager Masami Kondo. The film is distributed by Toho and premiered on May 25, 2018.

Reception
As of April 2018, After the Rain had over 2 million copies in print.

In 2018, alongside Kūbo Ibuki, After the Rain won the 63rd Shogakukan Manga Award in the General category. The manga was ranked fourth in the 2016 edition of Takarajimasha's Kono Manga ga Sugoi! guidebook. In 2016, the manga was nominated for the 9th Manga Taishō Awards; and was ranked 7th with 42 points. After the Rain ranked fourth on the "Nationwide Bookstore Employees' Recommended Comics" by the Honya Club website in 2016.

Notes

References

External links
 
 
 

2014 manga
Aniplex
Coming-of-age anime and manga
Live-action films based on manga
Noitamina
Romance anime and manga
Seinen manga
Sentai Filmworks
Shogakukan franchises
Shogakukan manga
Slice of life anime and manga
Vertical (publisher) titles
Winners of the Shogakukan Manga Award for general manga
Wit Studio
Japanese romance films